Voodoo is a 1995 American horror film directed by Rene Eram and written by Brian DiMuccio and Dino Vindeni.  Corey Feldman stars as a youth who must contend with a Voodoo cult.  Filmed in the United States in the spring of 1995, Voodoo was released on VHS  by A-Pix Entertainment in November 1995, and was first released in the United States on DVD format through Simitar Entertainment in 1997.

Plot 
Unable and unwilling to live apart from his girlfriend, Andy has decided to move from the UK to the United States, so that he can be near Rebecca while she studies medicine at university. He meets Cassian Marsh, who persuades him to approach the Omega fraternity where Marsh is the leader. Following a typical fraternity initiation, Andy is offered a place in the Omega house and readily accepts. He then notices a suspicious looking old man hanging around the campus and the stranger warns him that the brotherhood are hiding a dark secret: Marsh is part of a Voodoo cult and that remaining at the fraternity could be dangerous. Andy decides he is just a crazy old man; but, as events unfold, it seems that Marsh is just using the Frat house as a front in order to practice voodoo along with his zombie friends.

Cast
 Corey Feldman as Andy Chadway
 Jack Nance as Lewis
 Joel J. Edwards as Cassian Marsh
 Diane Nadeau as Rebecca
 Ron Melendez as Eric
 Sarah Douglas as Prof. Conner
 Amy Raasch as Wendy
 Brian Michael McGuire as Ken
 Christopher Kriesa as Baird
 Clark Tufts as Loomis
 Maury Ginsberg as Deitz
 Darren Eichhorn as David
 Brendan Hogan as Stan

Reception 
Peter Dendle wrote in The Zombie Movie Encyclopedia, "This run-of-the-mill campus thriller crosses Angel Heart with Revenge of the Nerds, as if that were a niche that really needed filling."

References

External links 
 
 

1995 films
1995 horror films
American zombie films
1990s English-language films
American supernatural horror films
Films about Voodoo
1990s American films